In British politics, the Shadow Secretary of State for Exiting the European Union, or informally Shadow Brexit Secretary, was a position within the opposition's shadow cabinet that dealt with issues surrounding the UK withdrawal from the EU. The position was only ever a part of Jeremy Corbyn's Shadow Cabinet. If a Labour government had been elected, the Shadow Secretary of State would have been a likely choice to serve as the new Secretary of State.

Keir Starmer held the position between October 2016 and April 2020, although the position became unusual, as the Department for Exiting the European Union was abolished in January 2020, so there was no Secretary of State for Exiting the European Union to be shadowed. The position was formally abolished on 4 April 2020, once the incumbent Shadow Brexit Secretary was elected leader.

There were also a number of Shadow Ministers for Brexit, that often deputised for the Shadow Secretary of State.

List of Shadow Secretaries of State for Exiting the European Union

List of Shadow Ministers for Exiting the European Union 
Three shadow ministers were appointed by Jeremy Corbyn in October 2016. Matthew Pennycook resigned in September 2019 in order to attempt to stop Brexit. Jenny Chapman was one of the Red Wall MPs to be defeated in Boris Johnson's landslide victory in the 2019 general election, losing her seat of Darlington, County Durham to the Conservative candidate Peter Gibson. Chapman was replaced by Thangam Debbonaire in January 2020. The position was abolished when Keir Starmer was elected Labour Leader in April 2020.

References

Brexit
Official Opposition (United Kingdom)
2016 establishments in the United Kingdom
2020 disestablishments in the United Kingdom
United Kingdom and the European Union
Consequences of the 2016 United Kingdom European Union membership referendum